The International Union Against Tuberculosis and Lung Disease or The Union, is a global scientific organization headquartered in Paris with the stated goals to "improve health for people in low- and middle-income Countries". The Union focuses its work in three areas: Tuberculosis, Tobacco Control, and Lung and non-communicable diseases. The antecedents of The Union date to an 1867 meeting to discuss the tuberculosis plague, and include the former Central Bureau for the Prevention of Tuberculosis and the International Union Against Tuberculosis (IUAT). The Union no longer uses the acronym "IUATLD" as its short-form name.

History
Early pioneers were Robert Koch, Sir John Crofton and Karel Styblo.  According to The Lancet, in the 70s, Styblo "harnessed the meager resources of the International Union against Tuberculosis and Lung Disease and showed that, contrary to expert opinion, tuberculosis could be controlled in extremely poor countries: beginning in Tanzania, one of the poorest of them all". In 1982, it instituted World Tuberculosis Day, commemorating 100 years from the date when Robert Koch discovered cause of tuberculosis. The expanded name and mission were adopted in 1986. The Union organises the annual Union World Conference on Lung Health, the largest annual meeting on lung health in the world.

Past presidents include:

 1921: Robert Philip
 1922: E Dewez
 1924: F Morin
 1926: Theobald Smith
 1928: F A Piomarta
 1930: Théodor Frölich
 1932: Willelm Nolen
 1934: Eugenjusz Piestrzynski
 1937: Lopo de Carvalho
 1950: K A Jensen
 1952: Manoel de Abreu
 1954: A Crespo Alvarez
 1957: P V Benjamin
 1959: Ismail Tewfik Saglam
 1961: G J Wherrett
 1963: Attilio Omodei Zorini
 1965: Erich Schröder
 1967: Jan K Kraan
 1969: James E Perkins
 1971: V Chebanov
 1973: T Shimatzu
 1975: Miguel Jimenez
 1978: A Gyselen
 1983: H Rodriguez Castells
 1986: N C Sen Gupta
 1990: James Swomley
 1994: Rudolf Ferlinz
 1995–1998: Songkram Supcharoen
 1999–2000: Kjell Bjartveit
 2001–2003: Anne Fanning
 2004–2007: Asma El Sony
 2008–2011: S. Bertel Squire
 2012–2016: E. Jane Carter
 2017–2019: J. Chakaya Muhwa
 2020–present: Guy Marks

Activities

According to its website, The Union has twelve offices around the world serving Africa, the Asia Pacific, Europe, Latin America, the Middle East, North America and South-East Asia, with a focus on tuberculosis, HIV, lung health and non-communicable diseases, tobacco control and research.

Publications

The Union publishes two scientific journals; the International Journal of Tuberculosis and Lung Disease (IJTLD) and Public Health Action (PHA). The IJTLD is distributed to over 165 countries world-wide and has an impact factor of 2.76. The IJTLD is the reference for clinical research and epidemiological studies on tuberculosis. It is also the only peer-reviewed journal dedicated to lung health, including articles on non-tuberculosis-related respiratory diseases such as asthma, acute respiratory infection, COPD and the hazards of tobacco and pollution. Public Health Action is The Union's open-access online journal which is published quarterly. PHA addresses the need for showcasing operational research that addresses issues in health systems and services and aims to provide new knowledge to improve access, equity, quality and efficiency of health systems and services.

References

External links
 Official Website

Health charities in France
Tuberculosis organizations